Generation O!  is an American animated musical comedy children's television series made by Sunbow Entertainment, with co-production associated by Wang Film Productions in Taiwan and Ravensberger in Germany. The show was originally titled Molly O!, and was released under that title in some regions. It was created by David Hale, Tim Newman, James Proimos and Suzanne Collins, based on an original idea by Hale and Newman. Executive producers were Carole Wietzman, Martha Ripp and Ken Olshansky. The creative producer and director was Mike Milo and the Line Producer was Jodey Kaminsky-Cashman. Most of the episodes were written by Suzanne Collins, who later wrote The Hunger Games book series. John Hardman was the production executive at Kids' WB.

The show's visual design was based on Proimos' style. Every episode had at least one song and music video, which would be related to the episode's plot. For example, in one episode Molly gets mad at her brother and ends up writing a song called "Girls Rule, Boys Drool" in retaliation. Most of the songs used in the series were written by Hale and David Buskin.

This show aired from 2000 to 2001 on YTV and Kids' WB. Kids' WB aired it as part of their "Fraturdays" block. 13 episodes were produced. In Latin America, the show premiered on Nickelodeon on 2001, but was removed in early 2003. In the UK, the series was screened on the Disney Channel, but curiously unlisted in the schedules and aired in a late night slot and Toon Disney. In Australia it aired on Nickelodeon. In Ireland, it was screened on the Irish language network TG4 with the series dubbed into Irish. In Singapore, the series was broadcast on Kids Central.

Plot
Generation O! focuses on the character of Molly O, an 8-year-old rock star and the lead singer of the band "Generation O!" along with bassist Nub (an older British musician), guitarist Eddie (Molly's cousin), drummer Yo-Yo (a kangaroo), and manager Colonel Bob. Molly also spends time with her best friend Chadd, and tries to avoid her pesky brother Buzz.

Music
Each episode of Generation O! featured an original song performed by alternative rock band Letters to Cleo. While these songs were written by the show's writers, Letters to Cleo did write the show's opening theme.

Crew
Jodey Cashman- Line Producer
Anthony Mathews- Production Manager
Mike Milo- Creative Producer and Director
Tom McLaughlin- Sheet timing
Trevor Wall-Storyboard supervisor
Tim Harding props
Phip Dimetriadis- backgrounds
Becca Ramos- Additional backgrounds
Mike Inman - background color
Mike Guerena- character color
Brent Gordon and Mike Milo- character design and models
Glen Darcey - F/X & other drawings
Post Production was provided by Vitello Post in Hollywood

Cast
Voice actors for Generation O!:

 Chantal Strand as Molly O
 Kay Hanley as Molly O (singing voice)
 Tabitha St. Germain as Eddie
 Scott McNeil as Nub
 Jay Brazeau as Col. Bob
 Kathleen Barr as Mrs. O
 Doug Parker as Mr. O
 Matt Hill as Buzz
 Cathy Weseluck as Chadd
 Andrew Francis as Kemp
 Brian Dobson as Additional voices
 Cathy Weseluck as Additional voices
 Chiara Zanni as Additional voices
 Nicole Oliver as Additional voices
 Saffron Henderson as Additional voices

Episodes

Home media release
A few episodes were released on VHS in 2001 by Sony Wonder. The series has never been released on DVD.

References

External links
 
 

2000s American animated television series
2000s American musical comedy television series
2000 American television series debuts
2001 American television series endings
American children's animated comedy television series
American children's animated musical television series
Animated television series about children
YTV (Canadian TV channel) original programming
Kids' WB original shows
Television series by Sunbow Entertainment
Television series by Sony Pictures Television
English-language television shows